The Battle of Vác may refer to:
Battle of Vác (1684)
Battle of Vác (1849)